The Madagascan pygmy shrew (Suncus madagascariensis) is a species of mammal in the family Soricidae. It is the only known Malagasy shrew.

Taxonomy
Some taxonomists regard it as conspecific with the widely distributed Etruscan shrew, the smallest known mammal by mass, and likely to have been introduced to Madagascar from India or Southeast Asia by humans. It is found in Madagascar and the Comoros, at altitudes from sea level to 1500 m.

Distribution and habitat
It is thought to be more common in the less humid western and southern parts of Madagascar. This shrew may also be present on Socotra. The species is found primarily in forests.

Diet and behaviour
It is presumed to be solitary, nocturnal and insectivorous, like its relatives. The litter size is one or two. It is threatened by logging and other forms of deforestation.

References

Suncus
Mammals of Madagascar
Endemic fauna of Madagascar
Taxobox binomials not recognized by IUCN
Mammals described in 1848
Taxa named by Charles Coquerel
Taxonomy articles created by Polbot